Events from the year 1802 in Austria

Incumbents
 Monarch – Francis II

Events

 - Gesellschaft der Ärzte in Wien

Births

Deaths

References

 
Years of the 19th century in Austria